The Billy T Award is a New Zealand comedy award recognizing up-and-coming New Zealand comedians with outstanding potential. It has been presented annually since its inception in 1997 when Cal Wilson and Ewen Gilmour shared the award. The Billy T was shared between two comedians until 2001 when it became a solo award.

The awards are an initiative of the New Zealand Comedy Trust to ‘foster and encourage outstanding New Zealand talent.'

Billy T James 
The Billy T Awards were named in honour of New Zealand comedian Billy T. James. The winner receives ‘the yellow towel’ in tribute to the towel worn by James in some of his most famous sketches.

Judging 
The winner is selected from five nominees performing during the New Zealand International Comedy Festival. Five judges select a winner based on their proven comedic ability, talent, dedication and potential.

Billy T Award: winners and nominees

Controversy 
In 2003, Mike Loder was blacklisted from the 2004 festival after sending fake congratulatory letters to nominees Sully O’Sullivan and Penny Ashton. In 2005, Philip Patston, the 1999 winner who is gay and disabled, volunteered to give up his award in response to the rhetoric and policies of the National Party under Don Brash.

Trivia 
 Rhys Mathewson is the youngest recipient of the award at age 19.
 Benjamin Crellin  (2000–03) and Jamie Bowen (2002–04, 2007) share the record for most nominations (four).

References

New Zealand comedy
New Zealand awards
Comedy and humor awards